The Breeden-Runge Wholesale Grocery Company Building at 108 N. Frederick William St. in Cuero, Texas is a brick building that was built in 1911.  It served as a warehouse for the firm which was founded in 1911 with a capital stock of $85,000.

It was designed by architect Jules Leffland.  The building was listed on the National Register of Historic Places in 1988.

See also

National Register of Historic Places listings in DeWitt County, Texas

References

Commercial buildings on the National Register of Historic Places in Texas
Commercial buildings completed in 1911
Buildings and structures in DeWitt County, Texas
Warehouses in the United States
Warehouses on the National Register of Historic Places
National Register of Historic Places in DeWitt County, Texas
Grocery store buildings